The 2022–23 Croatian Futsal Cup is the 30th season of the Croatian Futsal Cup, the national cup for men's futsal teams in Croatia, since its establishment in 1993.

Calendar

Round of 32 
The pairs of the round of 16 were announced on 13 October after draw. Games were played between 28 and 30 October 2022, except of games including Novo Vrijeme and Futsal Pula due their games in UEFA Futsal Champions League.

1 Olmissum originally won the game 15–0, but it was later disqualified due to the participation of three players under penalty of the third yellow card.

Round of 16 
The pairs of the round of 16 were announced on 10 November after draw, except of games including Novo Vrijeme and Futsal Pula due their games in UEFA Futsal Champions League.

Final Eight 
On 20 January 2023 it was decided that Futsal Dinamo will be hosting the Final Eight tournament in Zagreb. The quarter-finals draw was held on 25 January 2023, the semi-finals draw will be held after the quarter-finals.

Quarter-finals

Semi-finals

Final

References 

2022 in futsal
Futsal competitions in Croatia
2022–23 in European futsal